Rainy Seasons is a 2010 Iranian film, directed by Majid Barzegar. Barzegar's directorial debut, it tells the story of sixteen-year-old Sina (Navid Layeghi Moghadam), who is left with an apartment to himself as his parents divorce. He finds himself in a difficult situation, hounded by neighborhood tough Masoud (Alireza Bagheri) to whom he owes money, as he allows Nahid (Marzieh Khoshtarash) to stay with him temporarily. The movie was originally conceived as a short film before being developed into a full-length feature.

Cast
 Navid Layeghi Moghadam as Sina
 Marzieh Khoshtarash as Nahid
 Alireza Bagheri as Masoud
 Mehran Khodaei as Ali
 Elnaz Habibi as Ali's sister

Reception

Writing for SBS Movies, Don Groves panned the film, noting "deficiencies in the screenplay" such as the "insipid, sullen protagonist plus a meandering, listless narrative and a disappointing lack of tension or engagement with the characters." The film nevertheless won the Best Director award at the 2010 Dushanbe Film Festival.

References

External links
 

Iranian drama films
2010 films